Bente Kvitland (born 23 June 1974) is a Norwegian former footballer who was an Olympic champion with the Norway women's national football team. She played club football in the Toppserien for Trondheims-Ørn and Asker.

Kvitland grew up in Skaugdalen, Rissa. In 1991 she began playing club football for Stadsbygd and spent three seasons with Verdal from 1995 until 1997. She played for Trondheims-Ørn from 1999 until 2004, winning the Toppserien and the Norwegian Women's Cup on three occasions each. After winning another Cup with Asker in 2005, Kvitland retired from football to focus on her employment as a prison officer in Oslo.

In October 1999 Kvitland made her senior national team debut—a 4–0 win in Portugal—but she had not been selected for Norway's 1999 FIFA Women's World Cup squad. In Kvitland's fourth appearance she scored a free kick from 30 metres, the second goal in Norway's 3–0 2001 UEFA Women's Championship qualification win over England at Carrow Road on 7 March 2000.

She collected a total of 37 caps for Norway and was an alternate on the squad that won gold at the 2000 Summer Olympics in Sydney. She played in Norway's UEFA Women's Euro 2001 campaign, which ended with a 1–0 semi-final defeat by hosts Germany in Ulm.

International appearances

International goals
Scores and results list Norway's goal tally first.

References

External links
 
 Norwegian national team profile 
 Trondheims-Ørn club profile 

1974 births
Living people
Norwegian women's footballers
Footballers at the 2000 Summer Olympics
Olympic footballers of Norway
Olympic gold medalists for Norway
Olympic medalists in football
Toppserien players
Asker Fotball (women) players
SK Trondheims-Ørn players
Norway women's international footballers
People from Rissa, Norway
Norwegian prison administrators
Medalists at the 2000 Summer Olympics
Women's association football defenders
Sportspeople from Trøndelag